Season one of Satisfaction began airing on 5 December 2007, on Foxtel's Showcase and finished on 30 January 2008. Airing 10 episodes, the show explored the lives of 6 women, all with the same profession. Cast includes Alison Whyte, Madeleine West, Peta Sergeant, Kestie Morassi, Bojana Novakovic, and Diana Glenn. Using the slogan "Six Women. Two Lives. One Profession" to promote the show.

Cast

Starring
 Diana Glenn as Chloe
 Kestie Morassi as Natalie
 Bojana Novakovic as Tippi
 Peta Sergeant as Heather
 Madeleine West as Mel
 Alison Whyte as Lauren

Guest Starring
Robert Mammone as Nick
Sullivan Stapleton as Josh
Nicholas Bell as Alex

Special Guest
James Sorensen as Private School Boy

Episodes

Release
On 18 October 2008, Satisfaction season 1 was released on DVD, featuring, 10 episodes, and plenty of special features.

References
 http://showtime.com.au/showcase/show/13048/
 http://www.ezydvd.com.au/item.zml/805402

2007 Australian television seasons
2008 Australian television seasons
Satisfaction (Australian TV series)